Willie James Adams (December 12, 1941 – September 28, 2019) was a former American football defensive end and linebacker for the Washington Redskins of the National Football League (NFL) and the Montreal Alouettes of the Canadian Football League (CFL).  He played college football at New Mexico State University and was drafted in the eleventh round of the 1965 NFL Draft.

Death 
He died September 28, 2019, aged 77. He is survived by his wife Henrietta, children Deborah, Willie, Jr., Cynthia, Mark, Wendell, and Hammond, as well as seventeen grandchildren, and seven great-grandchildren.

References

External links
 

1941 births
Living people
American football defensive ends
American football linebackers
Washington Redskins players
Ed Block Courage Award recipients